is a manga series written by Hiroyuki Yoshino and illustrated by Kenetsu Satō. The manga series is currently serialized by Akita Shoten and is published in Japan in the seinen/shōnen manga Champion Red magazine and the chapters collected in tankōbon. The series was first released on December 20, 2006 and is continuing as of 2013.

This manga series has been licensed internationally, translated, and published in several countries outside Japan. This series is licensed in France by Kazé, listing the first 14 volumes in their online catalog. In Italy the manga series is licensed by J-Pop Edizioni. and Ever Glory Publishing in Taiwan. Tokyopop licensed this series for the North American market and published the first four volumes, however since resuming business in December, 2012, this series title has not been listed in their online catalog.



Volume list

References

External links 
 

Qwaser of Stigmata, The